Frans Smet-Verhas, born Frans Smet (Temse, 21 August 1851 – Antwerp, 20 March 1925), was a Belgian architect. He was one of the principal designers to employ Art Nouveau in Antwerp at the beginning of the twentieth century.

Career
Following his marriage to Sophia Verhas, Frans Smet took the surname Smet-Verhas in 1887. His activities as an architect extended from 1880 to 1910, during which time he became one of the major architects to use Art Nouveau in Antwerp. He designed two of the most famous Art Nouveau structures in the city: the eccentric House of the Five Continents (Huis de Vijf Werelddelen), finished in 1901, and the House of the Battle of Waterloo (Huis De Slag van Waterloo), built in 1905. Before turning to Art Nouveau around 1900, he had constructed several buildings using eclectic and Flemish Renaissance-revival styles. His son Arthur Smet (1886–1974) also became an architect and later taught Renaat Braem.

Major works
All in Antwerp unless otherwise noted
 Hôtel Het Zuidkasteel, Bolivarplaats, 2 (1882), eclectic
 Post Office, Arendstraat 52 (1891), Flemish Renaissance-revival 
 Group of houses "Den Overvloed en Den Ooievaar" (The Affluence and the Stork), Cogels Osylei, 3/5/7 (1896), Flemish Renaissance-revival 
 Kunstenaarswoning (House and studio) Jef Koefoed, Anselmostraat 86 (1898), eclectic
 Houses at Waterloostraat, numbers 14, 16, 18 (1901), Art Nouveau
 House of the Five Continents (Huis De Vijf Werelddelen) (1901), Art Nouveau
 Selderslachts-Clasman House (1904), Art Nouveau
 House of the Battle of Waterloo (Huis De Slag van Waterloo) (1905), Art Nouveau
 Schroyens House (1908), Art Nouveau

See also
 Art Nouveau in Antwerp
 Art Nouveau

Bibliography
 Françoise Dierkens-Aubry and Jos Vandenbreeden, Art nouveau en Belgique: Architecture et Intérieurs (Paris: Duculot, 1991).

References

Architects from Antwerp
Art Nouveau architects